Enzo Hernán Gutiérrez Lencinas (born 28 May 1986) is an Argentine professional footballer who plays for Peruvian club Universitario de Deportes as a forward.

Club career

Early career
Gutiérrez was born at Charata, Argentina. He began his career at capital club Boca Juniors, one of the most successful club of South America and also in the entire world, where he spent eight years in the football academy, growing up with footballers like Matías Rodríguez and Fernando Gago. He made his Argentine Primera División debut on 11 June 2005 against Arsenal de Sarandí at La Bombonera. Gutiérrez under the orders of Alfio Basile as coach in that season, earned the treble, winning the league title, added to Copa Libertadores and Copa Sudamericana honours.

In January 2007, Gutiérrez joined on loan to Peruvian side Universidad San Martín de Porres, alongside his teammate and friend Gastón Cellerino, helping the team in achieve Torneo Descentralizado title and his team's qualification to 2008 Copa Libertadores. On 31 December, Enzo momentarily returned to Boca and ended his contract on 31 December.

Rangers
On 22 January 2008, Cellerino and Enzo joined Chilean Primera División side Rangers, both as a free agents. The players settled in Talca along their families, like when they played in Peru. He made his debut on 1 February in a 1–0 loss with Deportes La Serena at La Portada.

O'Higgins
Gutiérrez made his debut for O'Higgins against San Luis Quillota, coming off the bench as a substitute in the 73rd minute, replacing to Lucas Ojeda in a 2–1 away victory, and his first goal came on 17 February 2010 in a 1–0 home win over Universidad Católica.

Universidad de Chile
He joined Club Universidad de Chile during the summer transfer window in 2012.

Career statistics

Honours

Club
Boca Juniors
 Primera División Argentina (2): 2005 Apertura, 2006 Clausura
 Copa Sudamericana (1): 2005
 Recopa Sudamericana (1): 2005

Universidad de San Martín
 Peruvian Primera División (1): 2007 Descentralizado

Universidad de Chile
 Copa Chile (1): 2012-13
 Primera División de Chile (1): 2014 Apertura

Santiago Wanderers
 Copa Chile (1): 2017
 Primera B (1): 2019

References

External links
 Argentine Primera statistics at Fútbol XXI 
 
 Enzo Gutiérrez at Football Lineups

1986 births
Living people
Argentine footballers
Association football midfielders
People from Charata
Argentine Primera División players
Primeira Liga players
Chilean Primera División players
Peruvian Primera División players
Categoría Primera A players
Boca Juniors footballers
Club Deportivo Universidad de San Martín de Porres players
Rangers de Talca footballers
C.S. Marítimo players
O'Higgins F.C. footballers
Universidad de Chile footballers
Club Deportivo Palestino footballers
Millonarios F.C. players
Santiago Wanderers footballers
Argentine expatriate footballers
Expatriate footballers in Chile
Expatriate footballers in Peru
Expatriate footballers in Ecuador
Expatriate footballers in Portugal
Expatriate footballers in Colombia
Argentine expatriate sportspeople in Portugal
Sportspeople from Chaco Province